Clinton Township is one of nineteen townships in DeKalb County, Illinois, USA. As of the 2010 census, its population was 1,868 and it contained 758 housing units.

Geography

Cities, towns, villages
 Waterman

Cemeteries
 Johnson Grove
 North Clinton

Airports and landing strips
 Wade Airport

Demographics

School districts
 Indian Creek Community Unit District 425

Political districts
 Illinois's 14th congressional district
 State House District 70
 State Senate District 35

References
 
 US Census Bureau 2009 TIGER/Line Shapefiles
 US National Atlas

External links
 City-Data.com
 Illinois State Archives
 Township Officials of Illinois
 DeKalb County Official Site

Townships in DeKalb County, Illinois
1849 establishments in Illinois
Townships in Illinois